Rubus corchorifolius is an Asian species of raspberry native to Korea, Japan, China, Vietnam, and Myanmar. It is an erect shrub up to 3 meters tall with prickly stems. Leaves are simple, with pointed lobes near the base of the blade. Flowers are pink or white. The fruits are red and used to make jams, juice, and wine.

References

External links
 

corchorifolius
Flora of China
Flora of Eastern Asia
Flora of Myanmar
Flora of Vietnam
Plants described in 1782